Arthur Creek is a stream in the Texas County, Missouri. It is a tributary of the Big Piney River. The stream headwaters arise west of Missouri Route 137 between Yukon and Raymondville. It flows northwest under U. S. Route 63 northeast of Houston and on to its confluence with the Big Piney southwest of Prescott.

Arthur Creek has the name of George H. Arthur, a pioneer citizen.

See also
List of rivers of Missouri

References

Rivers of Texas County, Missouri
Rivers of Missouri
Tributaries of the Gasconade River